Kim Sang-hyun is a Korean name consisting of the family name Kim and the given name Sang-hyun, and may also refer to:

 Kim Sang-hyun (boxer) (born 1955), South Korean boxer
 Kim Sang-hyun (baseball) (born 1980), South Korean baseball player